Antispila nysaefoliella (tupelo leafminer moth) is a species of moth of the family Heliozelidae. It is found in south-eastern North America.

The wingspan is about 8 mm. Adults are on wing in spring.

The larvae feed on Nyssa sylvatica. They mine the leaves of their host plant. The mine is blotch-shaped and tends to expand radially and typically becomes more oblong-shaped at later instars. The larva feeds with its dorsal side facing the lower leaf surface.  Low (2008) observed that the larvae are able to make sounds using sclerotized structures on their dorsum and tail.  The last instars form an oval-shaped double-sided shield by encasing themselves with silk between the upper and lower mine layers. They then cut the shield and descend into the leaf litter for pupation. Larvae can be found from late August to early September.

References

Moths described in 1860
Heliozelidae